This is a list of the longest rail tunnels in India. In considering tunnels for this section, tunnels of underground metro railways have not been counted. Only tunnels on the main Indian Railways network longer than  have been listed.

Location
Most of the tunnels listed below are located in the Western Ghats, the only mountain range in the country that has good railway connectivity. There are longer tunnels that are under construction in the Himalayas in Jammu & Kashmir, as part of the USBRL Project. Pir Panjal Railway Tunnel, the 11.2 km long railway tunnel, passes through the Pir Panjal Range of middle Himalayas in Jammu and Kashmir. It is a part of its Udhampur – Srinagar – Baramulla rail link project, India's longest railway tunnel and reduced the distance between Quazigund and Banihal. But after the Patalpani Tunnel currently planned under construction in Madhya Pradesh,  from Indore city is completed in 2025, it will become the longest railway tunnel of India.

list
 Didwana Indawa 2510 meters on Dausa Gangapur line (Rajasthan)

See also

 Indian Railways
 List of tunnels
 List of longest tunnels
 Tunnel

References 

India, rail
Rail tunnels, India
 
Rail tunnels
Tunnels
Longest rail tunnels